Christopher Tsai (born December 20, 1974) is a Chinese-American investor and noted art collector. He is the founder of Tsai Capital Corporation, a New York-based investment management firm.

Early life and education

Born in Greenwich, Connecticut, to billionaire investor and philanthropist, Gerald Tsai, and model and actress, Marlyn C. Tsai, Tsai attended the Brunswick School in Greenwich, Connecticut, and graduated in 1993. Tsai began his career in finance at the young age of 11, working for his father, where he was tasked with analyzing investment opportunities for the Tsai family foundation. At age 18, Tsai studied securities analysis at the New York Institute of Finance.

Tsai attended Vermont's Middlebury College, where he graduated with a Bachelor of Arts degree in Philosophy and International Politics and served on the Middlebury College Arts Council.

Career

Tsai began investing at the age of 11 when he purchased five shares of an insurance company. He used money he made from gardening for the investment and made a $25 profit. Tsai recounts he convinced the broker to waive the fee for the transaction as it was more than the profit he made from the investment.

At the age of 16, Tsai began informally investing money for friends and business owners he knew from growing up in Connecticut. 

Tsai launched Tsai Capital in 1997 after working as an equity analyst for Bear Stearns and interning for value investors Mario Gabelli and John A. Levin. Tsai credits Benjamin Graham's The Intelligent Investor and Philip Arthur Fisher's Common Stocks and Uncommon Profits as two of his influences. His investment approach was also influenced by Charlie Munger of Berkshire Hathaway. 

Tsai is president and chief investment officer of Tsai Capital, an SEC-registered, value-oriented investment firm headquartered in New York City and focused on the long-term growth and preservation of capital. He founded the company in 1997 at the age of 22 and serves as chairperson of the firm's advisory committee  Tsai has written articles about art as an investment, including commentary in Investment and Pensions Europe "about investing in art as an alternative assets class", and "Back Door to China," specifically advocating investment in Chinese contemporary art, for Worth. Bloomberg, L.P. notes that he "has also been interviewed on Bloomberg Radio, China Money Network, Fox Business, [and] The Street.com TV", and "has written extensively about investing in emerging markets".

In 2014, Tsai launched Tsai Ventures, the venture capital arm of Tsai Capital. CrowdTangle, a Tsai Ventures portfolio company, was acquired by Facebook on Nov. 11, 2016. Founded in 2012, CrowdTangle had raised $2.2 million in venture funding from Tsai Ventures and other venture capital firms.

Art collection

Tsai is an avid art collector and first focused on contemporary Chinese art, which he accurately predicted would rise in value. Tsai is the world's largest collector of works by Ai Weiwei.

Tsai attributes his love of art to his father who collected works by Alexander Archipenko, Alexander Calder and Joan Mitchell. Through the Stockamp Tsai Collection, Tsai regularly contributes artwork to museums. These museums have included the Metropolitan Museum of Art in New York, the Pérez Art Museum Miami, the Victoria and Albert Museum in London and the National Gallery of Victoria in Melbourne.

Prior to deciding to build a collection around Ai, Tsai collected contemporary Chinese art broadly, beginning in 2003. Tsai traveled to China and acquired some 50 works by artists including Fang Lijun, Liu Xiaodong, Xie Nanxing, Zhang Huan and Zhang Xiaogang. In September 2004, Tsai published an article in Worth Magazine arguing that contemporary Chinese art was undervalued. In 2005, Tsai reiterated that contemporary Chinese art was undervalued, particularly when compared with contemporary Mexican artists.

Tsai adheres to a well-defined methodology in making art acquisitions, balancing instinct and analysis. Tsai has expressed interest in collecting the work of David Hammons and Berlinde De Bruyckere. Tsai prefers that the artwork he buys stays undervalued for as long as possible. Tsai stated, "It's like buying shares in a company that you know will be worth more in five or ten years. The last thing we want is for the stock to go up as we start buying." Tsai has been critical of art speculators looking to buy art for short-term financial gain.

Personal life

In addition to Tsai being the son of a famous investor, his grandmother, Ruth Tsai, was a pioneer for women in Shanghai. During World War II, she was the only woman to trade on the floor of the Shanghai Stock Exchange until Japanese troops occupied the Shanghai International Settlement on December 8, 1941, and trading was abruptly halted. Tsai is married to André Stockamp.

Tsai is a know philanthropist and has supported organizations such as the Asia Society, the Solomon R. Guggenheim Museum, and the World Monuments Fund to name a few.

See also
 Tsai Performance Center

References

External links
 Tsai Capital official website
 Fox Business video with Christopher Tsai - The cost of doing business in China.

1974 births
Living people
American finance and investment writers
American financial analysts
American financial company founders
American financiers
American hedge fund managers
American investors
American money managers
American stock traders
Brunswick School alumni
Businesspeople from Greenwich, Connecticut
Businesspeople from New York (state)
Middlebury College alumni
Private equity and venture capital investors
Stock and commodity market managers